Grynobius is a genus of beetles in the family Ptinidae. The genus contains a single species, Grynobius planus.

Its host plants include birch, alder, willow, hawthorn, and common beech.

References

Further reading

 
 
 
 
 

Ptinidae